A mortadella sandwich is any sandwich using mortadella, a large Italian sausage, and is a very popular sandwich in Brazil especially São Paulo. The sandwich is made from nearly a half a pound of mortadella sausage, Provolone cheese, sourdough bread, mayonnaise and Dijon mustard.

See also
 List of sandwiches

References 

Brazilian cuisine
Sandwiches